Simon Hall (1977 or 1978 – 23 February 2014) was a British murderer who is notable for having been wrongly helped by 'miscarriage of justice' campaigners, only for him to go on to confess to the murder he was convicted of and prove he was rightly convicted. Hall stabbed 79-year-old pensioner Joan Albert to death in her home in Capel St Mary, Suffolk in 2001, and was convicted of her murder two years later. Subsequently, the high-profile miscarriage of justice programme Rough Justice, then produced by well-known activist Louise Shorter, took up his case and aired a programme campaigning for him. Several MPs, Bristol University's 'Innocence Project' campaign group, his mother and girlfriend were also deceived into campaigning for him, and the Criminal Cases Review Commission (which had itself been set up in response to Rough Justice in 1997) referred his case to the Court of Appeal in 2009. However, the appeal court dismissed the appeal and he subsequently confessed his crime to prison authorities in 2013, before committing suicide in prison in 2014. His case was said to have gravely undermined the claims of many prisoners who claim their innocence and embarrassed miscarriage of justice activists, having proved that they had campaigned for a guilty man. 

The family of victim Joan Albert, who had to endure 10 years of false claims that Hall had never killed Albert, released a statement following Hall's confession saying: "During the last 10 years the publicity surrounding the appeals has been very distressing for our family, making moving on impossible...  we are also grateful to those who have helped us throughout this difficult ordeal".

Deceiving campaign

Murder
Hall was a burglar and had previous convictions for violence. He murdered Joan Albert, 79, in her home in Capel St Mary, Suffolk on 16 December 2001 in a burglary attempt gone wrong, stabbing her five times with a carving knife from her kitchen and leaving her to be found in her hallway. Hall had been out drinking with friends in Ipswich the night before the murder and had an alibi for most of the night and into the early hours of the following morning, except for between 5:30am and 6:15am, which was believed to be the time when the murder was committed. He was convicted of her murder in 2003 and sentenced to a minimum term of 15 years imprisonment, with the jury finding him guilty by a unanimous decision.

Claims of innocence and assistance

Hall refused to acknowledge his guilt and his legal team attempted to discredit the fibre evidence against him. In 2007 his case was promoted by Rough Justice and its then producer Louise Shorter, with his claims featured in the final episode of the programme that year. His case was also taken up by the University of Bristol Innocence Project (UoBIP), and they helped his case get referred to the Court of Appeal of England and Wales in 2009 via the Criminal Cases Review Commission, which itself had been set up in 1997 due to the campaigns of the Rough Justice programme. Hall's wife Stephanie, who he had married in prison in 2005, was convinced of his false claims of innocence, saying: "There was never a shadow of a doubt that they had the wrong guy, he didn't have it in him – he's too sensitive and kind." She had met him through writing letters to him in prison, saying: "I’d always written to him in prison but then we started writing almost every day. We realised that the spark was real... we fell in love through our letters and phone calls and he started opening up." For many years she ran a campaign called "Justice 4 Simon" in an attempt to free him from prison, and Hall regularly sent online messages to his supporters. Friends and family of Hall also backed him, setting up a website to highlight what they believed were the "weaknesses in the prosecution case against him", and wrongly claiming that he had no motive for killing Albert, a friend of his mother's. His campaign also won the backing of a number of MPs, and his case also featured in the book No Smoke: The Shocking Truth about British Justice by Sandra Lean. Famous lawyer Michael Mansfield agreed to represent him legally and lead his campaign to be freed.

Appeal

In 2011 the Court of Appeal upheld his conviction, rightly concluding that the conviction was correct and saying: "The scientific support for the assertion that the appellant was the source of the fibres found at the crime scene is compelling. We have no reason to doubt the safety of the jury's verdict and the appeal is dismissed." Even after this appeal was rejected the Bristol Innocence Project continued to wrongly promote his claims of innocence, complaining that the Court of Appeal had not taken his claims of innocence "seriously" and saying that they didn't seek "the truth of whether alleged victims of wrongful convictions are innocent or not". However, by this time Hall had already confessed to the crime to his wife Stephanie, revealing details including his motive for the crime. Despite this, Stephanie Hall continued to protest his 'innocence' to national prisoners' newspaper Inside Time.

Confession

In 2013, following the rejection of his appeal, Hall formally admitted his guilt to prison authorities, proving that he had been guilty all along and leading to outrage in the national media. ITV News noted that he had confessed after a "decade of denial" and The Telegraph highlighted that his false campaign of innocence had cost the taxpayer £500,000. Thousands of hours of legal research had been wasted on attempting to clear Hall's name, including many hours of work conducted by unpaid volunteers of the University of Bristol Innocence Project. Even shortly before he finally confessed, he had been complaining on the 'Justice4SimonHall' website that he was supposedly being stopped from returning to living in Ipswich where he had murdered his victim because her family did not want him to return to live near them. Shortly after Hall confessed, the post and the campaign website itself was deleted. In January earlier in the year the CCRC had also been examining a new claim by Hall that he was carrying out a burglary elsewhere on the day Albert's body was found, but Hall dropped this appeal after he finally admitted his guilt. Campaigner Ray Hollingsworth, who had claimed that he had gathered evidence that showed two other people were responsible for the murder, said: "If I'm wrong about this, I'm wrong. I will hold my hands up. I'm not going to hide from anyone. I believed in his innocence".

Retired detective Roy Lambert, who led the original inquiry, said in response to the confession: "I've always been satisfied that he was responsible for killing Joan. Lots and lots of people were supporting him, MPs were supporting him and now he's deceived all of them because all along he's known that he's done it". Suffolk Police released a statement saying: "Over the 10 years since Hall's conviction there have been a number of appeals and campaigns which have asserted that Simon Hall was wrongfully convicted of Mrs Albert's murder. These events and the related uncertainty have undoubtedly exacerbated the suffering Mrs Albert's family have had to endure since Joan was murdered. We sincerely hope that Simon Hall's admissions to having committed this brutal crime will in some way enable the family to move on with their lives." The family of victim Joan Albert, who had had to endure years of claims that Hall was innocent, released a statement saying: "During the last 10 years the publicity surrounding the appeals has been very distressing for our family, making moving on impossible, but we would like to thank Suffolk Police, including Roy Lambert and his team, who carried out the original investigation, to present day officers who continue to support us. We are also grateful to those who have helped us throughout this difficult ordeal".

Suicide
Only one year after he finally confessed, Hall was found unresponsive in his cell at HM Prison Wayland in Norfolk, and was later pronounced dead, having committed suicide by hanging. Stephanie Hall accepted that she had wrongly believed in his innocence.

Impact
The Hall case was described as an embarrassment to 'miscarriage of justice' activists such as Louise Shorter and her team at Rough Justice, and an example of a case that they "quietly bury" as they do not wish to appear to have wrongly defended a guilty person. The New Statesman said that the Hall case had "gravely undermined the claims of many of the genuinely innocent".

See also
Stephen Downing – British man who was cleared of murder on appeal after a campaign by Don Hale, only to allegedly go on to confess to the murder
Ernest Barrie – British man released on appeal after another Rough Justice campaign, only to go on to kill a man
Michael Weir – British man released on appeal for murder but later convicted at retrial
James Hanratty – British murderer who was the subject of a 'miscarriage of justice' campaign led by Bob Woffinden, but later proven to be guilty
Colin Norris
Jessie McTavish
Siôn Jenkins
M25 Three
David Smith

References

1970s births
2014 suicides
2001 crimes in the United Kingdom
2001 in England
2003 in England
2007 in England
2011 in England
2009 in England
2013 in England
2014 in England
BBC television documentaries
British crime television series
Investigative journalism
Crime in Suffolk
Crime in England
Murder in England
2001 murders in the United Kingdom
2000s in England
Criminals from Suffolk
People convicted of murder by England and Wales
People from Ipswich
British male criminals
English criminal law
2001 in British law
2003 in British law
2007 in British law
2009 in British law
2011 in British law
2013 in British law
2014 in British law
Murder trials
2000s trials
Court of Appeal (England and Wales)
Court of Appeal (England and Wales) cases
Year of birth uncertain